Kohurestan Rural District is a rural district (dehestan) in the Central District of Khamir County, Hormozgan Province, Iran. At the 2006 census, its population was 12,962, in 2,793 families. The rural district has 31 villages.

References 

Rural Districts of Hormozgan Province
Khamir County